Psycoloquy was a refereed interdisciplinary open access journal that was published from 1990 to 2002  and was sponsored by the American Psychological Association (APA) and indexed by APA's PsycINFO and the Institute for Scientific Information. The editor-in-chief was Stevan Harnad. A 1995 book on electronic publishing resulted from a listserv discussion about an article published in Psycoloquy.

Psycoloquy published articles and Open Peer Commentary in all areas of psychology as well as cognitive science, neuroscience, behavioral biology, artificial intelligence, robotics/vision, linguistics, and philosophy. Psycoloquy was suspended in 2002, and is now defunct.

References

External links
Psycoloquy

Cognitive science journals
Publications established in 1990
Publications disestablished in 2002
American Psychological Association academic journals
Defunct journals
Open access journals